Saint Alfred may refer to:
 Saint-Alfred, Quebec, municipality in Canada
Alfred the Great (846-899), English king venerated as a saint in some Christian traditions

See also
St Alfred Street, former name of Alfred Street in Oxford, England